Battle of Santa Cruz de Tenerife may refer to:

 Battle of Santa Cruz de Tenerife (1657), a battle of the Anglo-Spanish War (1654–1660).
 Battle of Santa Cruz de Tenerife (1706), a battle of the War of the Spanish Succession.
 Battle of Santa Cruz de Tenerife (1797), an amphibious assault in the French Revolutionary Wars.